DFFB may refer to:
Deutsche Film- und Fernsehakademie Berlin
 A human gene that encodes the caspase-activated DNase protein